Social programs in Canada include all Canadian government programs designed to give assistance to citizens outside of what the market provides. The Canadian social safety net includes a broad spectrum of programs, many of which are run by the provinces and territories. Canada also has a wide range of government transfer payments to individuals, which totaled $176.6 billion in 2009—this cost only includes social programs that administer funds to individuals; programs such as medicare and public education are additional costs.

Background

Usage 
In Canada, the entirety of the social provisions of government are called social programs, as opposed to social welfare in European/British parlance.

Like in the United States, welfare in Canada colloquially refers to direct payments to low-income individuals only, and not to healthcare and education spending. It is rarely used in Canada as the name of any specific program, however, because of its negative connotations. In Canadian slang, welfare is also sometimes referred to as "the dole" (also common amongst Britain and other Commonwealth countries) or "pogey". Before the Second World War, such programs were generally known as "relief".

History

Generally speaking, before the Great Depression most social services were provided by religious charities and other private groups.  Changing government policy between the 1930s and 1960s saw the emergence of a welfare state, similar to many Western European countries. Most programs from that era are still in use, although many were scaled back during the 1990s as government priorities shifted towards reducing budget deficits that were reaching levels deemed too high.

Healthcare

All provinces in Canada provide universal, publicly-funded healthcare to Canadian citizens, permanent residents and certain temporary residents, with their costs partially subsidized by the federal government. Approximately 70% of expenditures for health care in Canada come from public sources, with the rest paid privately (both through private insurance, and through out-of-pocket payments). The extent of public financing varies considerably across services. For example, approximately 99% of physician services, and 90% of hospital care, are paid by publicly funded sources, whereas almost all dental care and most prescription drug cost are paid for privately. Most physicians are self-employed private entities which enjoy coverage under each province's respective healthcare plans. Compared to other single-payer health systems in the world, Canada is unusual in banning the purchase of private insurance or care for any services that are listed.  This is meant to prevent what is described as 'two-tier healthcare', which would allow the rich to "jump the queue." However, in 2005 the Supreme Court of Canada ruled in Chaoulli v. Quebec (Attorney General) that the ban on private care could be unconstitutional if it caused unreasonable delays for patients.

Education

In Canada, provinces and territories are responsible for their elementary and secondary schools. Education is compulsory up to the age of 16 in most provinces, 17 and 18 in others. Both elementary and secondary education is provided at a nominal cost. Private education is available, but its comparatively high costs and the relative quality of public education result in it being less popular than in the United States or Britain. Post-secondary schooling is not free, but is subsidized by the federal and provincial governments. Financial assistance is available through student loans and bursaries.

Housing

Canadian mortgages are insured by the federal Canadian Mortgage and Housing Corporation and most provinces have ministries in charge of regulating the housing market. It was created in the 1940s and in Quebec in 1958.

Unemployment benefits

Low-income support
All provinces maintain a low-income-support program known by names such as "social assistance", "income support", "income assistance" and "welfare assistance"; popularly they are known as welfare (French:  or ). Like in the United States, welfare in Canada colloquially refers to direct payments to low-income individuals only, and not to healthcare and education spending. Moreover, in Canadian slang, welfare is also sometimes referred to as 'the dole' or 'pogey'.

The purpose of these programs is to alleviate extreme poverty by providing a monthly payment to people with little or no income. The rules for eligibility and the amount given vary widely between the provinces. This program was created in the 1940s, and in Quebec in 1958. The original plan was for Ottawa to pay half of the financial support for families and the other half paid by each of the provinces.

Seniors

Most Canadian seniors are eligible for Old Age Security, a taxable monthly social security payment. In addition, most former workers can receive Canada Pension Plan or Quebec Pension Plan benefits based on their contributions during their careers. As well many people have a private pension through their employer, although that is becoming less common, and many people take advantage of a government tax-shelter for investments called a Registered Retirement Savings Plan or may save money privately.

Children and families

Usually each province has a department or ministry in charge of child welfare and dealing with adoption, foster care, etc.  the federal government also offers the Universal Child Care Benefit to subsidize the cost of daycare spots or other forms of childcare.

Disability

Each province is responsible for disability welfare:

 Alberta – Assured Income for the Severely Handicapped.
 British Columbia – Income Assistance for Persons with Disabilities (Disability Assistance), which is run and maintained by the Ministry of Social Development and Poverty Reduction.
 Ontario  – Ontario Disability Support Program, which is run and maintained by the Ministry of Children, Community and Social Services. The program offers income and employment assistance for disabled people and the Assistive Devices Program to provide funding to help pay the cost of assistive devices for people with long-term physical disabilities.
Quebec – Programme de solidarité sociale (Contraintes sévères à l'emploi), which is run and maintained by the Ministry of Employment and Social Solidarity.

Regional aid 

The government has several agencies dedicated to developing specific regions.

Atlantic Canada Opportunities Agency
Canadian Northern Economic Development Agency
Economic Development Agency of Canada for the Regions of Quebec
Federal Economic Development Initiative for Northern Ontario
Federal Economic Development Agency for Southern Ontario
Western Economic Diversification Canada

See also
 Basic income in Canada
 Poverty in Canada
Matthew effect (Sociology)
 Welfare
 Welfare state
 Social safety net
 Social security
 Social policy

Comparisons
 American social programs
U.S. Social Security
Australian social security
 Indian social programs
Italian welfare
New Zealand welfare
 Scandinavian welfare model
Swedish welfare
Swedish social security
Finnish welfare
UK welfare

References

Further reading

External links
Human Resources and Skills Development Canada
Social Programs - Indian and Northern Affairs Canada

Government in Canada
Society of Canada
Economy of Canada
Politics of Canada

Social security in Canada